Ali Cheikh Dib is a Syrian former footballer who played as a midfielder.

Career
Cheikh Dib won the Syrian Premier League twice with Al-Hurriya in 1992 and 1994. Then, he was part of the Syria national football team which competed in the 1996 AFC Asian Cup.

Honours
Individual
 Lebanese Premier League Best Goal: 2000–01

References

External links
 
 

1972 births
Living people
Syrian footballers
Association football midfielders
Syria international footballers
Al-Ittihad Aleppo players
Homenmen Beirut players
Hurriya SC players
Proodeftiki F.C. players
Tishreen SC players
1996 AFC Asian Cup players
Syrian expatriate footballers
Expatriate footballers in Lebanon
Syrian expatriate sportspeople in Lebanon
Lebanese Premier League players
Syrian Premier League players